SAFE may stand for:

Acts and projects 
 SAFE Act, one of many passed or proposed laws with this name
 State Administration of Foreign Exchange, aka SAFE (China), an agency of the Chinese government
 Strategic Action For Emergencies, a fictional group to counter S.H.I.E.L.D. in Marvel Comics
 Synchronized Armed Forces Europe, the concept of synchronising of the European military forces

Organisations 
 SAFE (New Zealand organisation), Save Animals From Exploitation, a New Zealand animal advocacy organisation
 SAFE Society of Aviation and Flight Educators, a professional aviation organization
 SAFE Stroke Alliance for Europe, a coalition of charities that support stroke survivors
 SAFE (Struggle Against Financial Exploitation), a UK Parliamentary Working Group who campaign against financial fraud and deception 
 SAFE Ireland, anti-domestic violence organization, fund-raised for by "Cherry Wine"
 State Administration of Foreign Exchange (SAFE) of the People's Republic of China

Science and technology 
 Scaled agile framework (SAFe), a process framework for running Agile software development projects at scale
 SAFE (cable system), South Africa Far East cable, an underwater communications cable linking South Africa and Malaysia 
 Safe affordable fission engine, a series of small experimental nuclear reactors designed by NASA
 Survivor Activating Factor Enhancement, a metabolic pathway

Investing 
 Simple agreement for future equity (SAFE), a financing vehicle for startup businesses providing an alternative to a priced equity round or to a convertible note

See also 
 Safe (disambiguation)